Back from Rio is the sixth studio album by American singer-songwriter, guitarist and co-founder of the Byrds Roger McGuinn.  It was released on January 8, 1991, more than a decade after McGuinn's previous solo album, Thunderbyrd. The album was issued following the release of the Byrds box set and musically it leans on the sound of the Byrds thanks to McGuinn's ringing 12-string electric guitar and vocal contributions from ex-Byrds members David Crosby and Chris Hillman. Also prominent on the album are Tom Petty and the Heartbreakers, with Petty co-authoring and duetting with McGuinn on the album's lead single "King of the Hill". In addition, several members of the Heartbreakers provide musical backing on a number of the album's tracks. Other prominent songwriters on the album—besides McGuinn and his wife Camilla—are Elvis Costello, Jules Shear and Dave Stewart of the Eurythmics.

The album was generally well received by music critics and it peaked at No. 44 on the Billboard 200 album chart.

Two singles were drawn from the album: "King of the Hill" and "Someone to Love", which peaked at #2 and #12 respectively, on the Billboard Hot Mainstream Rock Tracks chart. 

In Europe, Back from Rio was released in February 1991 and featured different cover artwork.

Track listing

Side one 
 "Someone to Love" (Roger McGuinn, Camilla McGuinn) – 3:32
 "Car Phone" (Mike Campbell, R. McGuinn) (Featuring Stan Ridgway) – 4:33
 "You Bowed Down" (Elvis Costello) – 3:52
 "Suddenly Blue" (Scott Cutler, Roger McGuinn, Dennis Morgan) – 3:49
 "The Trees Are All Gone" (Roger McGuinn, Camilla McGuinn) – 3:51

Side two 
 "King of the Hill"  (Roger McGuinn, Tom Petty) – 5:27
 "Without Your Love" (Roger McGuinn, Camilla McGuinn) – 3:59
 "The Time Has Come" (Scott Cutler, Roger McGuinn) – 3:45
 "Your Love Is a Gold Mine" (Roger McGuinn, Dave Stewart) – 4:06
 Includes "Back from Rio Interlude" (Roger McGuinn, Tom Petty, Jeff Lynne)
 "If We Never Meet Again" (Jules Shear) – 4:28

Personnel 

Mike Campbell – electric guitar, slide guitar, baritone guitar
David Cole – percussion, piano, acoustic guitar, MPC-60
Elvis Costello – backing vocals
David Crosby – vocals, backing vocals
George Hawkins – bass guitar
Dan Higgins – saxophone
Chris Hillman – vocals, background vocals
John Jorgenson – acoustic guitar, electric guitar, baritone guitar, saxophone, bass guitar, mandolin
Stan Lynch – drums, percussion
Roger McGuinn – lead vocals, backing vocals, 12-string electric guitar, 12-string acoustic guitar
Michael Penn – backing vocals, 12-string acoustic guitar
Tom Petty – lead vocals ("King of the Hill"), backing vocals
Stan Ridgway – telephone voice
Kimmy Robertson – telephone voice
Timothy B. Schmit – backing vocals
J. Steven Soles – backing vocals
Benmont Tench – organ, keyboards, Hammond B-3
 Michael Thompson – electric guitar, acoustic guitar

Production 

 David Cole – producer, engineer, mixing
 Peter Doell – engineer
 John Hall – demo engineer, mixing at Firetail-on-the-Hill Studios
 Jesse Kanner – mixing
 Roger McGuinn – producer, mixing
 Wally Traugott – mastering

Charts

Weekly charts

Year-end charts

Notes 

Roger McGuinn albums
1990 albums
Arista Records albums

Albums recorded at Capitol Studios